Porąbki may refer to the following places:
Porąbki, Opole Voivodeship (south-west Poland)
Porąbki, Kielce County in Świętokrzyskie Voivodeship (south-central Poland)
Porąbki, Włoszczowa County in Świętokrzyskie Voivodeship (south-central Poland)